Valley District Cricket Club is a cricket club playing in the Bulls Masters premiership, the leading club cricket competition in Queensland, Australia. The club was established on 16 August 1897 and is one of only four remaining foundation clubs (along with South Brisbane, Redlands and Toombul). They have historically been located in the inner Brisbane suburb of Fortitude Valley and now play home matches at the Ashgrove Sportsground Park.

Australian Test cricketers to play for the Valley club include Matthew Hayden, Allan Border, Don Tallon, Kepler Wessels, Usman Khawaja, Stuart Law and England wicket-keeper Geraint Jones OBE (in third grade).

Notable Queenslanders to play for Valley include Leo O'Connor (cricketer), Roy Levy, Otto Nothling, Malcolm Francke, Joe Dawes, Geoff Foley, Lee Carseldine and Luke Feldman.

Current contracted Queensland Bulls players are Usman Khawaja, Lachlan Pfeffer, Mark Steketee and Jack Wildermuth, along with Queensland Fire players Mikayla Hinkley, Georgia Prestwidge and Jessica Jonassen

Valley is the largest club in Australia in player numbers and is believed to be one of the biggest, if not the biggest cricket club in the world; it currently (2019/20 season) has over 1,300 junior players, 200 senior players, including 180 female players.

Success 
Valley is one of Brisbane's most successful cricket clubs in both senior and junior competitions. They have recently won the following:

See also

References

External links
Official club website
Official Facebook page

Queensland District Cricket clubs
Sporting clubs in Brisbane
1897 establishments in Australia
Cricket clubs established in 1897
Fortitude Valley, Queensland